René Pedroli (Montignies-sur-Sambre, Belgium, 19 July 1914 — Charleroi, Belgium, 17 July 1986) was a Swiss professional road bicycle racer. Although Pedroli was born and raised in Belgium, his parents were of Swiss nationality, and so was Pedroli. Because he was born and raised in Belgium, he mostly participated in Belgian races, even in the Belgian national championships in 1932. Pedroli was the winner of stage 12B in the 1937 Tour de France as member of the Swiss team.

Major results

1937
Tour de France:
Winner stage 12B

References

External links 

Official Tour de France results for René Pedroli

1914 births
1986 deaths
Sportspeople from Charleroi
Cyclists from Hainaut (province)
Swiss male cyclists
Swiss Tour de France stage winners